The treatise On Ancient Medicine is perhaps the most intriguing and compelling work of the Hippocratic Corpus. The Corpus itself is a collection of about sixty writings covering all areas of medical thought and practice. Traditionally associated with Hippocrates, (c. 460 BC – c. 370 BC) the father of Western medicine, philological evidence now suggests that it was written over a period of several centuries and stylistically seems to indicate that it was the product of many authors dating from about 450–400 B.C.

Hippocratic Corpus: structure
On the basis of its diverse arguments regarding the nature of medical therapeutics, the Hippocratic Corpus could be divided into four divisions or groups.

Group I: The humoral theory of medicine proposed that our bodies were made up of diverse                                                  
fluids, elements, or powers, that were considered to be the basic units or fundamental building   
blocks of all nature. Whereas, a more simplified and categorized version of this theory is usually associated with the four humors of black bile, blood, phlegm and yellow bile, the  humoral theory as presented in Group I of the Hippocratic Corpus is never structured or schematized. Its approach to understanding the diverse cause of illnesses and their cures is empirical in nature.

It therefore, takes a more holistic view of the human organism which defines simple categorization of disease causality and treatment or cure. It places emphasis on physis (nature) or unitary vital force of the organism by which the physician must be guided. It is the self-healing powers of the human organism, the inner physician, which must always be consulted in the diagnosis and treatment of sickness. The interaction of the humors within man must always be seen in this light. Indeed, this group viewed the human organism as being composed of an infinite number of humors and that disease consists in the isolation of one of these humors within the organism leading to an imbalance which must be cured through coction of this humor, a process leading to the restoration of balance.

Group II: The proponents of this group argue that in addition to cure through coction and evacuation may be added the therapeutic approach of treatment of sickness through the administration of contraries. This could be in the form of dietary prescription but also medicinal substances. Medicinal substances are chosen on the basis of their indwelling powers or virtues, a method of analysis also applied in the diagnosis of disease in relation to the human organism.

Group III: This group utilizes an analytical approach to the diagnosis and treatment of sickness. It relies on the formation of hypotheses based on systematized views of the humoral activity and their corresponding treatments. Its medical theory could be described as rational versus empirical. Diseases and their causes are categorized as are their respective remedies. It places emphasis on cure by contraries and largely ignores the concept of the self-healing capacity of the organism.  The organism and its environment are analyzed in terms of hypothesized causal processes. Treatment consists in opposing the humor, quality or power causing the disease by administering a remedy of opposite quality.

Group IV: This group according to Harris Coulter, "Consists of two works: Ancient Medicine and The Art. These two works provide analysis and critique of the therapeutic doctrine of Group three. The idea of cure through opposition between qualities is rejected, and a philosophical justification is given for the ideas underlying the works of Group 1."

Hippocratic Corpus: origins
The origins of the Hippocratic Corpus can be traced in the sixth and fifth centuries B.C. in Italy. There were two seminal schools of Western medical thought; there was Agrigentum on the southern coast of Sicily and Croton on the west coast of the Gulf of Taranto. Agrigentum was the home of Empedocles, while Croton harbored the Pythagorean sect of medical philosophy. The school of Agrigentum and Empedocles placed great emphasis on cure by contraries and thus should be associated with Group III of the Hippocratic Corpus. The school of Croton rejected the notion of cure by contraries while championing the medical philosophy that perceived the human organism consists of an infinite number of humors. The arguments of this group should be identified with Group IV of the Hippocratic Corpus.

The first medical philosopher of the school of Croton was Alcmaeon of Croton. Alcmaeon argued that the maintenance of good health required a balance of the powers of moist and dry, cold and hot, bitter and sweet. Sickness arises when there is an imbalance within the human organism caused by the predominance of one power over another. In the Agrigentum school of thought Empedocles hypothesized that the universe consisted of four elements: earth, water, air, and fire. On the basis of these four elements he sought to account for the origin of matter. Matter or the universe was generated out of these four elements and their mutual attraction and repulsion. The conflict between these two schools of thought became manifest in their medical philosophies. Whereas, Alcmaeon argued that there were indefinite number of diverse qualities that made up the human organism, Empedocles contended that there were four concrete or substantial elements. Whereas it is Empedocles' medical philosophy that ultimately inspires the humoral doctrine of human nature, it is Alcmaeon's theory that underpins the medical therapeutic doctrine proposed in On Ancient Medicine (Group IV). Alcmaeon's argument that there are an infinite number of causes for disease that cannot be simply organized into categories is the basic operating assumption of empirical medicine.  Therefore, medical knowledge continuously expanded thorough a firsthand experience and observation of the human organism within nature. It is in this light that On Ancient Medicine should be seen as an attempt by the advocates of the Alcmaeon and the empirical school of thought to respond to and critique the Empedoclean or humoral theory of medicine.

On Ancient Medicine
The basic arguments of On Ancient Medicine have three components. In chapters 1–19 the author responds to the supporters of the hypothesis theory of medicine. In so doing he argues that the exploration of medicine itself reveals the human organism as a blend of diverse substances or humors. Having set forth this humoral theory, he then critiques the hypothesis theory proposed by his opponents as being an oversimplified conception of the cause of disease. Against this backdrop, he discusses his own theory and method he employed in its discovery (chaps. 20–24). He then responds to the charge that ancient medicine is not a genuine medical art because it has limited accuracy. These arguments must be seen in the light of the author's theory of human physiology (chaps. 9–12).

Chapters 1–19
The author is responding to the supporters of the hypothesis theory by arguing that medicine has a systematic character to qualify it as a tekhne (art, craft or science). This genuine tekhne depends on the knowledge of the physician attained through first-hand experience that enables him to both distinguish diverse treatments and to realize success in their skillful administration (1). Medicine should not proceed with hypotheses or generalizations; rather it should be rooted in experience and discovery. It should be empirical in its methodology. Hence, in chapter 2 the author argues that medicine's principle and method enables the physician to make discoveries over a long period of time. The discipline must be flexible and receptive to new discoveries. In chapters 3–8, the author supports the claim that medicine has a method of discovery by giving an account of medicine's origins and discoveries. He traces it back to a regimen beneficial for the sick and observes that some foods are not beneficial for either the healthy or the sick.
The author cites accounts of human beings from the fifth-century who suffered as a result of their savage diet. As a result, techniques were developed for the preparation of food best suited in producing a healthy and civilized human being. He likens it to a medical discovery (3.4-6); and as such constitutes a general tekhne. The author establishes a close methodological parallel between cooking and medicine. In cooking it is critical to recognize that human beings have a nature distinct from animals. For instance, humans are less capable of digesting raw meats. Thus, allowances must be made in the preparation and cooking of meat that best suit the human metabolism (3.5). The most common element between cooking and medicine is the mixing and blending of foods. Medicine, however, requires a greater discrimination between food types and classes of individuals so that correct nutritional needs may be identified and prescribed (5). The practitioner in the end acquires mastery of preparing foods and the ability to identify the class of individuals to whom the food is administered. In this regard, cooking and medicine are the same (chaps. 7–8).

It is in chapter 13 that the author returns to his analysis of his opponent's hypothesis theory. His goal is to explore the potential consequences of the principle in question. The proponents of cure by contraries assume that all diseases have their roots in the humors hot, cold, wet, dry, and that the cure for each disease is the opposite of the cause. The author imagines a situation where a person changes his food from cooked to raw and as a result becomes ill. Thus, the cause of a given illness is associated with a given humor and the cure as being that humor's opposite. Hot therefore would cure cold, and dry would be the cure for wet. The author sees this as an oversimplification. He argues that cooking is a process in which the original raw food losses some of its qualities and gains others by mixing and blending (13.3). Human beings are affected by the food they consume because every food has its own innate virtues. It is important for the physician to identify these virtues (14.1-2). The attainment of such knowledge demands a clear understanding of human nature. The human being, explains the author, contains a blend of many humors. When the humors are balanced or properly mixed the human being is healthy, but when they are unbalanced or improperly mixed and one is more concentrated than the other, pain and disease is the result (14.4-6).  
	
In chapter 15 the author argues that whereas the proponents of humoral medicine see food purely as hot, cold, wet, or dry, human beings also possess a quality such as sweet or bitter. These qualities are the ones that cause serious harm to the body. In Chapter 16, the author presents a number of examples from common experience. For instance, in a fever hot and cold humors counteract each other in the body without the need of medical aid.  As he points out in chapter 17, however, in some cases the fever persists. This is an indication that hot is not the sole cause of the fever. There must be some other inherent factor responsible for sustaining the fever. In chapters 18 and 19, he continues to develop the idea that recovery from disease comes about when there is a blending and coction of the humors. Coction is the act or process of attaining a more perfect or more desirable condition. The importance of coction in the author's theory also reflects his close analogy between medicine and cooking. Just as the cook brings about coction in food external to the human organism; the physician brings about coction of the bodily humors.

Chapters 20–24

In chapter 20 the author dismisses the theories of human nature associated with Empedocles and the pre-Socratic inquiry as irrelevant to medical practices. He argues that their theories lean towards philosophy and have more to do with the art of writing than with medicine. The author believes that the theory of human nature must be based on medicine, through the observation of the human organism within nature. He takes exception to thinkers such as Empedocles who attempted to provide such an understanding through his cosmological theories. Practically speaking, for medicine to be effective the physician needs to know the true nature of man and this must be determined through his relationship to food, drink, and other practices associated with the human organism (20.3). Therefore, the physician must understand the constituency of food and its effects on the body of the patient he is treating. In Chapters 22–24 the author extends the nature theory to include bodily structures. He also expands his theory of knowledge by advocating the use of analogies to attain an understanding of that which cannot be observed directly within the human organism.

Chapters 9–12
In chapters 9–12 the author argues that there is a corresponding relationship between the physician's experience and knowledge and his ability to practice the art of medicine. The greater the general and specific knowledge attained by the physician, the more accurate his diagnostic and therapeutic skills to include preparation and administration of prescriptions or remedies. This is critical because the same illness manifests itself differently in each patient and treatment must correspond to individual symptoms, and not to the common symptoms. This also applies to dietary measures. Thus, in the preparation and administration of remedies or dietary measures, care must be given not only in selecting the quantity and quality of the preparation or remedy, but also to the timing of its administration which must take into account bodily rhythms. The physician, the author argues, must rely upon the reaction of the individual to the treatment.  This is indeed a complex process which demands both the education and precision of the physician.  Hippocrates argues that even if the ancient art of medicine "does not possess precision in everything; rather, since it has been able to come, by means of reasoning, from profound ignorance close to perfect accuracy, I think it much more appropriate to marvel at its discoveries as having been made admirably, correctly, and not by chance".

Date
The dates proposed by Schiefsky for On Ancient Medicine span from 440 to around 350 BC. There are a number of considerations which strongly suggest a date in the late fifth century. That the author refers to Empedocles (490–430 B.C.) as motivation of the method he attacks suggests a date not long after his peak of activity.  The author's sense of discovery and benefits of technology are characteristic of late fifth-century thought. The idea that human beings through technology rose from savage behavior has parallels in Sophocles' fifth-century work, Antigone. Furthermore, the author's attack on the written account of medicine by sophists as having nothing to do with the art of medicine is a discussion taken up by the fifth-century thinker Socrates in The Phaedo. Also, the treatise's interest of 'things in the sky and under the earth' also characterizes Aristophanes' Clouds (424 BC.) and Plato's Apology.

Influence
There are two main proponents when discussing the influences on the treatise, whether of philosophy on medicine or the reverse. Hans Diller attempted to show that the author's point of view was influenced mostly by Plato. Ludwig Edelstein argued the author characterized 'Hippocratic empiricism', "a methodological stance characterized by the rejection of all generalizations and resulting from the influence of Protagorean relativism on medical thought." The proponents for tracing influence in the opposite direction, from medicine to philosophy, argued that the work On Ancient Medicine influenced Protagoras. It is possible, however, that different thinkers could come to similar conclusions regarding natural philosophy and practice independently of one another.

Authorship
Since the work of Émile Littré in the nineteenth century, the treatise On Ancient Medicine has been scrutinized to aid in answering the 'Hippocratic question': the question about which of the works in the Hippocratic corpus were written by Hippocrates. Littré was the scholar most associated with advocating that On Ancient Medicine was written by Hippocrates. He thought that the treatise was the work to which Plato was referring in The Phaedrus. However, it is difficult to reconstruct the historical Hippocrates with our existing evidence amounting to a brief account in the Anonymous Londinensis papyrus, and a few references in Plato and Aristotle. Based on the information available for the treatise On Ancient Medicine, it is impossible to definitively answer the Hippocratic question.

Notes

References

External links
Greek text in Hippocratis Opera, I 1, De prisca medicina, ed. J. L. Heiberg, Leipzig/Berlin, 1927, pp. 36–55.

Scholarly Bibliography on Ancient Medicine compiled by John Porter, University of Saskatchewan.

Books about diseases
Books about health care